Milka Stojanović (13 January 1937) is a Serbian soprano opera singer, who achieved international success. She sang with the Belgrade National Opera from 1960 and started her international career in 1962 when she appeared at the Edinburgh Festival. She was a singer of the Metropolitan Opera and the permanent guest singer of the Bolshoi Theatre and the Vienna State Opera. Stojanović was voted the "Golden voice", one of the four most beautiful operatic voices of the 20th century and is listed as one of the greatest performers of the Verdian repertoire in the Villa Verdi.

Early life and education 
Milka Stojanović was born on 13 January 1937 in Belgrade. She studied world literature at the University of Belgrade Faculty of Philology, where she completed the course of the studies but didn't graduate.

Operatic career 
Stojanović debuted at the age of 22 as Amelia in Verdi's Un ballo in maschera on the stage of the Belgrade Opera in 1959. From 1960 she was a lead soprano singer of the Belgrade Opera and sang in the first Yugoslav staging of Giuseppe Verdi's Nabucco (as Abigaille) and Attila (as Odabella), and Vincenzo Bellini's Norma.

She made her debut at the  Metropolitan Opera in 1967 as Leonora in La forza del destino and went to sing with the company as Liù in Turandot, Amelia in Simon Boccanegra, Mimì in La bohème and the title roles of Aida and La Gioconda. She performed major soprano roles opposite Mario del Monaco, Franco Corelli, Plácido Domingo, Luciano Pavarotti, Tito Gobbi, Nicolai Gedda and Bruno Prevedi amongst others. Stojanović also extensively guested in the European opera houses, including the Bavarian State Opera in Munich, Hamburg State Opera, Cologne Opera, Deutsche Oper Berlin, Teatro dell'Opera di Roma, Venice, Palermo, Barcelona, Prague, Madrid, Syracuse, Romania, Hungary and Finland.

Her other Verdian roles include Desdemona in Otello, Violetta in La traviata and Élisabeth de Valois in Don Carlos. She also performed Puccini's Tosca and operas by Pietro Mascagni, Alexander Borodin (Yaroslavna in Prince Igor), Tchaikovsky (Liza in The Queen of Spades), Beethoven (Leonore in Fidelio) and others.

She remained the prima donna of the Belgrade Opera until her retirement in 1993.

Voice 
Stojanović's voice is a soprano with the lush sonority and subtle dynamic nuances, with the leveled registers in its basic, velvety tonality. Her singing is characterized by the refined interpretation and subtle musicality, paired with the exquisite vocal, technical and stylish qualities which allowed her to create performances of the high emotional intensity. As a result, her greatest success came in the roles for the dramatic soprano. She is also known as the cantata singer. Stojanović was also known for the singing of the Russian romances, which she sang with her husband, .

She was generally known for the quality of her voice. In the late 1960s, the Opera News magazine conducted the survey among the American critics and audience, who chose the four "Golden voices" of the 20th century: Stojanović, Renata Tebaldi, Beniamino Gigli and Mario del Monaco. In Verdi's house, Villa Verdi, in the village of Sant'Agata in Italy, there is a book with the list of the greatest performers of the Verdian repertoire and Stojanović is listed in it.

Personal life 
Marriage to Saramandić (1939-2012), member of the Belgrade Opera and one of leading Serbian bass singers, was her second. They married in 1970 and remained together until Saramandić's death on 30 January 2012. The couple had no children.

Accolades 
In 1959 she won the third prize at the Yugoslav competition for the young music artists in Zagreb and in 1960 she won at the singing contest for the young singers in Toulouse, France. She was awarded the "Golden Lyre", the award of the Yugoslav Composers Union, City of Belgrade's October award and four memorial plaques, awards of the National Theatre (which hosts the Belgrade Opera), etc. A monograph on her career was co-published by the National Theatre in Belgrade in 2012.

References 

1937 births
Living people
Serbian operatic sopranos
Singers from Belgrade
20th-century Serbian women opera singers